Virgin Airlines may refer to:

Active airlines:
Virgin Atlantic
Virgin Australia

Defunct airlines:
Virgin America (sold and merged into Alaska Airlines)
Virgin Atlantic Little Red
Virgin Blue 
V Australia
Pacific Blue Airlines
Polynesian Blue
Virgin Express (merged with SN Brussels Airlines to form Brussels Airlines)
Virgin Express France
Virgin Nigeria Airways (rebranded as Air Nigeria)
Virgin Sun (sold and merged into Air 2000)

See also
Virgin Group
Virgin Galactic
Virgin Orbit
Virgin Balloon Flights